The 1885 Crescent Athletic Club football team was an American football team that represented Brooklyn's Crescent Athletic Club during the 1885 college football season. The team compiled a 3–1 record.

Schedule

References

Crescent Athletic Club
Crescent Athletic Club football seasons
Crescent Athletic Club Football